Nicolas Sursock (1875–1952) was a Lebanese art collector and a prominent member of the Sursock family, one of the old aristocratic families of Beirut.

Legacy
Nicolas Sursock died in 1952 and is probably best known for bequeathing his private villa to the city of Beirut, to be transformed into a museum of modern art.  The villa is now known as the Nicolas Sursock Museum.

Last Will and Testament

"As I love fine arts and long for their expansion, particularly in my homeland, Lebanon, as I wish this country would receive a substantial part of fine arts, and my fellow citizens would appreciate art and develop an artistic instinct, for this purpose that I pursue and that I can only be beneficial and contribute to Lebanon's development, I wish there would exist in Beirut, capital of the Republic of Lebanon, museums and exhibition rooms open to everyone, where master-pieces and antiques would be preserved and displayed.

"…I therefore set up in the form of waqf (mortmain) all of the real estate and its contents form a museum for arts, ancient and modern, coming from the territory of the Republic of Lebanon, the other Arab countries or elsewhere, as well as a room where the Lebanese artists' works shall be exhibited.  It being understood that this museum shall remain eternally and perpetually (…)"
— Nicolas Sursock

See also
 Rue Sursock
 Sursock House

References

Businesspeople from Beirut
Lebanese art collectors
Greek Orthodox Christians from Lebanon
Sursock family
1875 births
1952 deaths